Olin Stephen Pace (March 9, 1891 – April 5, 1970) was an American politician and lawyer.

Early life and education
Pace was born near Dawson, Georgia. He attended the Georgia School of Technology in Atlanta, and graduated from the University of Georgia School of Law in Athens in 1914 with a Bachelor of Laws (B.L.) degree. While at UGA, he was a member of the Phi Kappa Literary Society.

Career
After admittance to the state bar in 1914, Pace became a practicing lawyer in Americus, Georgia. From 1917 to 1920, Pace served in the Georgia House of Representatives and then served in the Georgia Senate from 1923 to 1924. In 1936, he won election as a Democrat representing Georgia's 3rd congressional district in the United States House of Representatives during the 75th United States Congress. He was reelected to six additional terms in that seat and served from January 3, 1937, until January 3, 1951. Pace did not run for reelection in 1950 and returned to practicing law in Americus. He died in that city on April 5, 1970, and was buried in its Sunset Memorial Gardens.

External links

References

History of the University of Georgia, Thomas Walter Reed,  Imprint:  Athens, Georgia : University of Georgia, ca. 1949, p.2326

1891 births
1970 deaths
Georgia Tech alumni
University of Georgia alumni
Georgia (U.S. state) lawyers
Democratic Party members of the United States House of Representatives from Georgia (U.S. state)
Democratic Party members of the Georgia House of Representatives
Democratic Party Georgia (U.S. state) state senators
People from Terrell County, Georgia
People from Americus, Georgia
20th-century American politicians
20th-century American lawyers